HCST may refer to:

 HCST (gene)
 Hudson County Schools of Technology, a public school district in Hudson County, New Jersey